Herut Takele Legese (born 1938) is an Israeli activist of Beta Israeli origin, who engaged in underground activities in the 1980s to promote the aliyah to Israel of the Ethiopian Jews. She was arrested by the regime of Mengistu Haile Mariam, imprisoned for about two years, and after she emigrated to Israel, she was recognized as a prisoner of Zion.

Early years
Takele was born in Qwara, Ethiopia. Her father, Elka Takele, who was a Hebrew teacher, educated his children with a strong Jewish and community identity. In 1942, her father was appointed secretary of the governor of the town of Azezo near Gondar, and the family moved there. At the age of 16, Takele moved to Gondar with her brother, so that she could acquire an education, a rare step in those days in Ethiopia.

Activism
During the 1970s, Takele met with immigration activist Yamatu Negus Ezra. Ezra introduced her to other aliyah activists, including Gedaliah Eileen and David Shimon. In 1982, Takele was recruited by Henry Rosenberg of the American Association for Ethiopian Jews to work for helping the aliyah of Ethiopian Jews. Thus Takele began taking part in underground Zionist activities, at a time when this was considered illegal by the Derg. Risking her life, she assisted in hiding Ethiopian Jews seeking to emigrate to Israel, providing medical care, issuing passports, transferring funds and locating hiding places. Among others, the methods used to help the emigration of Ethiopian Jews ranged from fictitious employment contracts with companies abroad, scholarships abroad and bribes in exchange for an exit permit.

Arrest and imprisonment
In 1986, on her way to immigrate to Israel, a group of Jews was captured by the authorities; the men were interrogated under severe torture and finally broke up and named Takele as the person who had helped them. She was arrested by the police and imprisoned in the central prison in Addis Ababa. She was jailed in complete isolation from her children and family, in a prison cell with no windows, tortured and abused, suffered from cold and starvation, and tortured during interrogations, but refused to turn over her partners.

Emigration to Israel
In January 1990, Takele immigrated to Israel with her three young children. She was recognized as a prisoner of Zion, lived in Holon and worked at the Kirya Maternity Hospital in Tel Aviv. After that, she moved to Hadera, and until her retirement served as a teacher for new immigrants from Ethiopia, as a counselor who assists immigrants in their integration into Israel and coordinates a nursing home.

References

Activists against antisemitism
Beta Israel
Ethiopian emigrants to Israel
Ethiopian Jews
Israeli people of Ethiopian-Jewish descent
Jewish human rights activists
People from Azezo
People from Gondar
Political prisoners